Libertad is a city located in Merlo Partido, Buenos Aires Province, Argentina. It forms part of the Greater Buenos Aires urban conurbation.

Its origin goes back to the 1870s when, by that time, a rural settlement was thriving around a pulpería (public house) called La Libertad (Freedom), from where the town took its name.
 
During the last decades a group of prominent neighbors had been working to obtain the autonomy of the city and make Libertad a new partido in the province.

Libertad is bordered by Parque San Martín (west), Pontevedra (south), Merlo (northwest), San Antonio de Padua and Morón (north) and La Matanza Partido (east).

External links

 City of Libertad

Merlo Partido
Populated places in Buenos Aires Province
Populated places established in 1893
Cities in Argentina